The Medicare Payment Advisory Commission (MedPAC) is an independent, non-partisan legislative branch agency headquartered in Washington, D.C. MedPAC was established by the Balanced Budget Act of 1997 (P.L. 105–33).  The BBA formed MedPAC by merging two predecessor commissions, the Prospective Payment Assessment Commission (ProPAC), established in 1983, and the Physician Payment Review Commission (PPRC), which formed in 1985.

The commission's 17 members bring diverse expertise in the financing and delivery of health care services. Commissioners are appointed to three-year terms (subject to renewal) by the Comptroller General of the United States and serve part-time. Its primary role is to advise the US Congress on issues affecting the administration of the Medicare program. Specifically the commission's mandate is to advise the US Congress on payments to private health plans participating in Medicare and health providers serving Medicare beneficiaries. MedPAC is also relied on by Medicare administrators and policy makers to evaluate beneficiaries' access to care and the quality of care received. MedPAC's mandate is broad enough that it can also evaluate other issues affecting Medicare.

MedPAC produces two major reports to the United States Congress each year that contain recommendations to improve Medicare. For example, its June 2008 report to Congress, "Reforming the Delivery System," made several recommendations along "a path to bundled payment."

Current commissioners

 Chairman: Michael Chernew, Ph.D.
 Vice Chairman: Amol Navathe, M.D., Ph.D.
 Lynn Barr, M.P.H.
 Lawrence Casalino, M.D., Ph.D.
 Robert A. Cherry, M.D., M.S.
 Cheryl L. Damberg, Ph.D.
 Stacie B. Dusetzina, Ph.D.
 Marjorie Ginsburg, B.S.N., M.P.H.
 David Grabowski, Ph.D.
 Jonathan Jaffery, M.D., M.S., M.M.M. 
 Kenny Kan, F.S.A., C.P.A., C.F.A., M.A.A.A.
 Gregory P. Poulsen, M.B.A.
 Betty Rambur, Ph.D., R.N., F.A.A.N.
 Wayne J. Riley, M.D.
 Jaewon Ryu, M.D., J.D.
 Dana Gelb Safran, Sc.D. 
 Scott Sarran, M.D.
Commission leadership
 Executive Director: James E. Mathews, Ph.D. 
 Deputy Director: Dana Kelley, M.P.A. 
 Assistant Director: Stephanie Cameron, Sc.M.
 Chief Financial Officer: Mary Beth Spittel, M.S.

See also
 Accountable care organization
 Independent Payment Advisory Board
 Medicare Advantage
 Specialty Society Relative Value Scale Update Committee (or Relative Value Update Committee; RUC)

References

External links
 Official MedPAC website

Agencies of the United States Congress
Medical and health organizations based in Washington, D.C.
Medicare and Medicaid (United States)